Metahepialus plurimaculata is a moth of the family Hepialidae. It is endemic to South Africa.

References

Endemic moths of South Africa
Moths described in 1914
Hepialidae
Moths of Africa